Litorisediminivivens is a Gram-negative and aerobic genus of bacteria from the family of Rhodobacteraceae with one known species (Litorisediminivivens gilvus).

References

Rhodobacteraceae
Bacteria genera
Monotypic bacteria genera